Actisecidae is a family of bryozoans belonging to the order Cheilostomatida.

Genera:
 Actisecos Canu & Bassler, 1927

References

Bryozoan families